Miliary fever was a medical term in the past (Wolfgang Amadeus Mozart's death report showed this term), used to indicate a general cause of infectious disease that cause an acute fever and skin rashes similar to the cereal grain called proso millet.

After subsequent advances in medicine, this term fell into disuse, supplanted by other more specific names of diseases, for example the modern miliary tuberculosis.

External links 
 . Annals of the Rheumatic Diseases, 1991; Vol.50: pp. 963–964

Obsolete medical terms